The 1958 California Golden Bears football team was an American football team that represented the University of California, Berkeley in the Pacific Coast Conference (PCC) during the 1958 NCAA University Division football season. In their second year under head coach Pete Elliott, the Golden Bears compiled a 7–4 record (6–1 against PCC opponents), won the PCC championship, lost to Iowa in the 1959 Rose Bowl, and outscored their opponents by a combined total of 207 to 200.

The team's statistical leaders included Joe Kapp with 649 passing yards and 582 rushing yards and Jack Hart with 334 receiving yards. Kapp and Hart were also the team's co-captains. Kapp was later inducted into the College Football Hall of Fame.

This is California's last Rose Bowl to date.

Schedule

Roster

References

External links
 1958 California Golden Bears - College Football at Sports-Reference.com

California
California Golden Bears football seasons
Pac-12 Conference football champion seasons
California Golden Bears football